Conus nodulosus is a species of sea snail, a marine gastropod mollusk in the family Conidae, the cone snails and their allies.

Like all species within the genus Conus, these snails are predatory and venomous. They are capable of "stinging" humans, therefore live ones should be handled carefully or not at all.

Description
The size of the shell varies between 35 mm and 51 mm. The shell has an elevated, channeled spire. Its color is yellowish, delicately and openly reticulated with chestnut. The aperture is roseate.

Distribution
This marine species is endemic to Australia and occurs off Western Australia.

Taxonomy
Conus nodulosus has often been treated as a geographical variant or subspecies of Conus victoriae. They have a disjunct distribution, the latter occurring from Exmouth to the Western Australia / Northern Territory border, whereas nodulosus has a distribution restricted from Geraldton to Kalbarri and the Abrolhos. For conservation implications, the two are here listed as distinct.

References

  Sowerby, G.B. 1864. Descriptions of three new shells. Proceedings of the Malacological Society of London 1864: 3 pp
 Wilson, B.R. & Gillett, K. 1971. Australian Shells: illustrating and describing 600 species of marine gastropods found in Australian waters. Sydney : Reed Books 168 pp.
 Wilson, B. 1994. Australian Marine Shells. Prosobranch Gastropods. Kallaroo, WA : Odyssey Publishing Vol. 2 370 pp.
 Röckel, D., Korn, W. & Kohn, A.J. 1995. Manual of the Living Conidae. Volume 1: Indo-Pacific Region. Wiesbaden : Hemmen 517 pp.
  Petit, R. E. (2009). George Brettingham Sowerby, I, II & III: their conchological publications and molluscan taxa. Zootaxa. 2189: 1–218
 Puillandre N., Duda T.F., Meyer C., Olivera B.M. & Bouchet P. (2015). One, four or 100 genera? A new classification of the cone snails. Journal of Molluscan Studies. 81: 1–23

External links
 The Conus Biodiversity website
 Cone Shells - Knights of the Sea
 

nodulosus
Gastropods described in 1864
Gastropods of Australia